Qoʻshkoʻpir District (Қўшкўпир тумани, قوشكوپىر تۇمەنى) is a district of Xorazm Region in Uzbekistan. The capital lies at the town Qoʻshkoʻpir. The district consists of 6 urban-type settlements (Qoʻshkoʻpir, Qoromon, Oʻrta qishloq, Xonbod, Shixmashhad, Sherobod) and 12 rural communities.

References

Xorazm Region
Districts of Uzbekistan